The Grizzly is a wooden roller coaster located at California's Great America  in Santa Clara, California. The ride was designed by Curtis D. Summers and manufactured by Kings Island Construction. It uses traditional tracks with steel wheels on the cars, and, therefore, is designed to maintain positive-g loading on the cars and riders throughout its course.

Reputation

Opened in 1986, the Grizzly is a typical 'out and back' wooden coaster. The ride was retracked by Great Coasters International in 2014 and in 2017. As a result, the Grizzly has a faster and smoother ride.

See also
 The Bush Beast
 Grizzly (Kings Dominion)
 Wilde Beast

References

External links

California's Great America
Roller coasters operated by Cedar Fair
Roller coasters in California
1986 establishments in California